Streptomyces anandii is a bacterium species from the genus Streptomyces which has been isolated from soil from in the region of Al-Taif in Saudi Arabia.
Streptomyces anandii produces pentaene G8, gilvocarcin V, gilvocarcin M and gilvocarcin E.

See also
 List of Streptomyces species

References

Further reading

External links
Type strain of Streptomyces anandii at BacDive -  the Bacterial Diversity Metadatabase

anandii
Bacteria described in 1965